The American Journal of Clinical Nutrition (AJCN) is a monthly peer-reviewed biomedical journal in the fields of dietetics and clinical nutrition.

The journal was established in 1952 as the Journal of Clinical Nutrition, edited by S.O. Waife and published by the Nutrition Press. It was continued in series under the present title from 1954 and was published by the American Society for Clinical Nutrition (ASCN). It is now published by the American Society for Nutrition.
The journal's editor-in-chief is Christopher P Duggan of Harvard Medical School.

A poll conducted in 2009 by the Biomedical and Life Sciences Division of the Special Libraries Association identified the journal as among the "100 most influential journals ... over the last 100 years" in the fields of biology and medicine. According to the Journal Citation Reports, the journal has a 2021 impact factor of 7.045.

Conflicts of interest 
Marion Nestle voiced concerns in November 2013 about conflict of interest by the AJCN board. Nestle stated that of the twelve-member editorial board "the majority — 7 of the 12 — list major corporate affiliations. The list of food companies for which they consult or advise ... includes Coca-Cola, PepsiCo, The Sugar Association, The National Restaurant Association, ConAgra, McDonald’s, Kellogg, Mars, and many others."

In a 2015 report, Michele Simon also voiced concerns regarding corporate involvement with the American Society for Nutrition's journals.

The journal publicly lists the conflicts of interest of its editorial board on its website.

References 

English-language journals
Food science journals
Monthly journals
Publications established in 1952